Norbert Pfennig (born 8 July 1925 in Kassel — died 11 February 2008 in Überlingen) was a German microbiologist.

Norbert Pfennig described with Bernhard Schink Pelobacter acidigallici, a bacterial species in the genus Pelobacter. P. acidigallici is able to degrade trihydroxybenzenes.

References

German microbiologists
1925 births
2008 deaths